The Big East Conference is a high school athletic conference in Eastern Wisconsin.  It participates in the WIAA.

Member schools

See also 

 List of high school athletic conferences in Wisconsin

References

External links 

 The Big East website
 WIAA website

Wisconsin high school sports conferences